Austin Manuel Hooper (born October 29, 1994) is an American football tight end for the Tennessee Titans of the National Football League (NFL). He played college football at Stanford, and was drafted by the Atlanta Falcons in the third round of the 2016 NFL Draft.

Early years
After leaving Pine Valley Middle School in San Ramon, California and graduating from St. Raymond School in Dublin, California, Hooper attended De La Salle High School in Concord, California where he played for the football team. He was rated by Rivals.com as a three-star recruit and committed to Stanford University to play college football. Hooper was listed as a defensive end by Rivals and also by ESPN who had him rated as a four-star recruit and the #261 player overall in the nation regardless of position.

College career
After redshirting his first year at Stanford in 2013, Hooper played in all 13 games as a redshirt freshman in 2014. He finished the season with 40 receptions for 499 yards and two touchdowns. As a sophomore in 2015, Hooper had 34 receptions for 438 yards for six touchdowns, including a career best 79 yards and a touchdown in an upset of then #6 USC. He was a finalist for the John Mackey Award, and First-team All-Pac-12.

Collegiate statistics

Professional career
On January 4, 2016, it was announced that Hooper would enter the 2016 NFL Draft, forfeiting his last two years of eligibility. Hooper came to the decision after discussing it with his head coach David Shaw and his family. He chose to declare due to the draft class being really thin at tight end and his draft stock being high after coming off an impressive season. He was one of 15 tight ends to receive an invitation to the NFL Scouting Combine in Indianapolis, Indiana. He had an overall impressive performance, finishing third among all tight ends in the 40-yard dash, fourth in the bench press, fifth in the three-cone drill, and finished sixth among his position group in the vertical. On March 17, 2016, Hooper opted to participate at Stanford's Pro Day and chose to only perform positional drills for scouts and team representatives from all 32 NFL teams, that also included San Francisco 49ers' head coach Chip Kelly and Oakland Raiders' offensive coordinator Bill Musgrave. Throughout the pre-draft process, Hooper attended private workouts and visits with the Miami Dolphins, Atlanta Falcons, Denver Broncos, and Tennessee Titans. Hooper was projected to be a second or third round pick by NFL draft experts and scouts. He was ranked the second best tight end prospect in the draft by NFLDraftScout.com and the third best tight end by Sports Illustrated and NFL analyst Mike Mayock.

Atlanta Falcons
The Atlanta Falcons selected Hooper in the third round (81st overall) of the 2016 NFL Draft. He was the second tight end selected,
behind Arkansas' Hunter Henry who the San Diego Chargers selected in the second round (35th overall). Hooper was reunited with former Stanford teammate Levine Toilolo.

2016 season

On May 5, 2016, the Falcons signed Hooper to a four-year, $3.21 million contract that includes a signing bonus of $773,428.

Throughout his first training camp, Hooper competed with Levine Toilolo and Jacob Tamme for job as the starting tight end. Head coach Dan Quinn named him the third tight end on the Falcons' depth chart behind Tamme and Toilolo.

Hooper made his NFL debut in the Falcons' season-opener against the Tampa Bay Buccaneers and made the first catch of his career on a 14-yard pass by Matt Ryan in the third quarter before being tackled by Buccaneers' safety Bradley McDougald during a 31–24 loss. On October 2, Hooper caught his first NFL touchdown on a 42-yard pass by Matt Ryan in a 48–33 victory over the Carolina Panthers. During a Week 8 matchup against the Green Bay Packers, Hooper earned his first NFL start and had a season-high five receptions for 41 yards in a narrow 33–32 victory. Starting tight end Jacob Tamme suffered a shoulder injury during the game and was placed on injured/reserve for the remainder of the season on November 21, 2016. The following week, he made three receptions for 46 yards and scored on a two-yard pass from Matt Ryan as the Falcons routed the Buccaneers 43–28. In Week 15, Hooper caught a nine-yard pass during a 41-13 victory over the San Francisco 49ers, but left after suffering a grade-2 knee sprain that caused him to miss the remaining two games of the regular season. He finished his only season under offensive coordinator Kyle Shanahan in the  season with 19 receptions for 271 receiving yards and three touchdowns in three starts and 14 games.

The Falcons finished the 2016 season atop the NFC South with an 11-5 record. On January 14, 2017, Hooper appeared in his first playoff game and caught a ten-yard pass as the Falcons defeated the Seattle Seahawks 36–20 in the NFC Wild Card Round. After the Falcons defeated the Green Bay Packers in the NFC Championship, they went on to face the New England Patriots in Super Bowl LI. During the game, Hooper made three receptions for 32 yards and scored a 19-yard touchdown in the second quarter of the Falcons 34–28 overtime loss.

2017 season
Hooper entered training camp slated as the starting tight end after the retirement of Jacob Tamme. He was named the starting tight end to begin the regular season under new offensive coordinator Steve Sarkisian.

Hooper started the Falcons' season-opener at the Chicago Bears and made two receptions for a career-high 128 receiving yards and caught a career-long 88-yard touchdown reception thrown by quarterback Matt Ryan in a 23–17 victory. During a Week 4 contest against the Buffalo Bills, Hooper tied his then career-high with five receptions for 50 receiving yards during a 23–17 loss. On October 15, 2017, he caught a career-high seven passes for 48 yards in the Falcons' 20–17 loss to the Miami Dolphins. At the midpoint of the 16-game season, Hooper was second on the team in receiving yards only to All-Pro wide receiver Julio Jones. Overall, Hooper finished the 2017 season with 49 receptions for 526 receiving yards and three receiving touchdowns.

2018 season
Hooper remained as the Falcons' starting tight end going into the 2018 season. He scored his first receiving touchdown of the season in Week 2 against the Carolina Panthers. In Week 11, against the Cleveland Browns, he had a career-high 10 receptions for 56 yards and a touchdown in the loss. He finished the season with 71 receptions for 660 yards and four touchdowns. On January 15, 2019, Hooper was named to his first Pro Bowl as a replacement for Eagles tight end Zach Ertz.

2019 season
In Week 3 against the Indianapolis Colts, Hooper caught six passes for 66 yards and two touchdowns as the Falcons lost 27–24. In Week 4 against the Tennessee Titans, Hooper caught nine passes for a career-high 130 yards in the 24–10 loss. In Week 6 against the Arizona Cardinals, Hooper caught 8 passes for 117 yards and a touchdown in the 34–33 loss. In Week 10 against the New Orleans Saints, Hooper had four receptions for 17 yards and a touchdown in the 26–9 win. Hooper suffered an MCL sprain during the win and was ruled out for the next three games. In Week 16 against the Jacksonville Jaguars, Hooper caught seven passes for 82 yards in the 24–12 win. On January 20, 2020, Hooper was named to his second Pro Bowl as a replacement for 49ers tight end George Kittle. Overall, Hooper finished the 2019 season with 75 receptions for 787 receiving yards and six receiving touchdowns.

Cleveland Browns

2020 season
On March 20, 2020, Hooper signed a four-year deal with the Cleveland Browns. The deal is worth $44 million, with a $10 million signing bonus. Hooper finished the 2020 regular season with 46 catches for 435 yards and four touchdowns in his debut season for the Browns. In the Wild Card Round against the Pittsburgh Steelers, Hooper caught seven passes for 46 yards and a touchdown on 11 targets.

2021 season

Hooper was the starting tight end going into the season for the Browns. He finished the 2021 season with 38 receptions for 345 receiving yards and three receiving touchdowns.

On March 17, 2022, Hooper was released by the Browns.

Tennessee Titans
On March 21, 2022, Hooper signed a one-year contract with the Tennessee Titans.

NFL career statistics

Regular season

Postseason

References

External links

Twitter
Tennessee Titans bio
Stanford Cardinal bio

1994 births
Living people
American football tight ends
Atlanta Falcons players
Cleveland Browns players
People from San Ramon, California
Players of American football from California
Sportspeople from the San Francisco Bay Area
Stanford Cardinal football players
National Conference Pro Bowl players
Tennessee Titans players
De La Salle High School (Concord, California) alumni